Ayatollah Mohsen Mojtahed Shabestari (1937 – 17 November 2021) was an Iranian Shiite cleric and politician. He was a member of the 1st, 2nd, 3rd, 4th and 5th Assembly of Experts from the East Azerbaijan electorate. 4th term Mojtahed Shabestari won with 671,254 and last period 743,818 votes. He was MP of Islamic Consultative Assembly in the electoral district of Tehran in the beginning of the revolution for first, second, fourth and fifth terms.

He was also Representative of the Supreme Leader in East Azerbaijan and fourth imam Jumu'ah for Tabriz in northwest of Iran after Iranian Revolution from 1995 until his resignation in 2017. Mojtahed Shabestari was a member of Ahl Al-Bayt World Assembly. His son Javad Mojtahed Shabestari is member of the Assembly of Experts from the West Azerbaijan.

Shabestari died in Tehran on 17 November 2021.

See also 
 List of Ayatollahs
 List of members in the First Term of the Council of Experts

References

External links
 Mohsen Mojtahed Shabestari Website

1937 births
2021 deaths
People from Shabestar
Members of the Assembly of Experts
Deputies of Tehran, Rey, Shemiranat and Eslamshahr
Members of the 1st Islamic Consultative Assembly
Members of the 2nd Islamic Consultative Assembly
Members of the 4th Islamic Consultative Assembly
Members of the 5th Islamic Consultative Assembly
Representatives of the Supreme Leader in the Provinces of Iran
Combatant Clergy Association politicians